Azul is a central partido of Buenos Aires Province in Argentina.

The province was founded on December 16, 1832, and the people are known as Azuleños.

Settlements
Azul
16 de Julio
Pablo Acosta
Ariel
Arroyo de los Huesos
Cacharí
Chillar
Lazzarino
Martín Fierro
Miramonte
Nieves
Parish y Shaw

External links
 Official Website
 Ministry of the Interior statistics

Partidos of Buenos Aires Province
States and territories established in 1832